Hasanova is a village in the Karlıova District, Bingöl Province, Turkey. The village is populated by Kurds of the Abdalan and Cibran tribes and had a population of 427 in 2021.

The hamlets of Burmataş, Konak and Yukarı Çır are attached to the village.

References 

Villages in Karlıova District
Kurdish settlements in Bingöl Province